Ringdown is a 4.0 hectare (9.9 acre) biological Site of Special Scientific Interest west of Burnworthy in the Blackdown Hills of Somerset, notified in 1990.

The site is located on a valley side in the Blackdown Hills where outcrops of both Cretaceous Upper Greensand and underlying Triassic Keuper Marls occur. Amongst the vegetation present are two species which are very restricted in South West Britain, white beaksedge (Rhynchospora alba) and dioecious sedge (Carex dioica). This site is the only known location for the latter in Somerset. A colony of the small pearl-bordered fritillary (Boloria selene) is found here.

References 

Sites of Special Scientific Interest in Somerset
Sites of Special Scientific Interest notified in 1990
Nature reserves in Somerset